Charlotte Blindheim (née Undset, 6 July 1917 – 5  March 2005) was a Norwegian archaeologist. 
She was the first female member of the scientific staff at the University of Oslo to be permanently employed when she hired as the museum curator in 1946.

Biography
She was born in Kristiania (now Oslo), Norway. She was the daughter of Sigge Pantzerhielm Thomas (1886-1944) and Signe Dorothea Undset (1887-1973). 
Her father was a classical philologist and lecturer at the University of Oslo. She completed a  master's degree in archaeology in 1946 at the University of Oslo, writing her thesis on Viking costume and jewellery. She was subsequently hired as a curator at the University as the museum's first permanently employed female member of scientific staff.

As an archaeologist, Blindheim became particularly known  for her work with the excavations at Kaupang in Skiringssal in the former municipality of Tjølling (now Larvik in Vestfold). Excavations were started systematically in the spring of 1950  and continued until the first half of the 1970s. In 1968 she became a curator in Vestfold, a position which she retained until her retirement in 1987.

Awards
Blindheim received the King's Medal of Merit (Kongens fortjenstmedalje)  in gold during 1987.

Personal life
Blindheim was the maternal granddaughter of  archaeologist, Ingvald Undset (1853-1893) and the niece of novelist Sigrid Undset, who was awarded the Nobel Prize in Literature for 1928. She was married to medieval art historian Martin Edvard Blindheim (1916-2009). She died during 2005 and was buried at Vår Frelsers gravlund in Oslo.

Selected works
Blindheim, Charlotte; (1953) Kaupang : markedsplassen i skiringssal 	(Oslo: Norsk arkeologisk selskap) 
Blindheim, Charlotte;  Tollnes, Roar L. (1972) Kaupang: Vikingenes Handelsplass (Oslo: Mortensen) 
Blindheim, Charlotte; (1977) Vikingtog og vikintid : en innføring i bilder og tekst for undervisningsbruk (Oslo: Schibsted Forlag)   
Blindheim, C.; Heyerdahl-Larsen, B., and Ingstaf, A. S. (1998)  Kaupang-funnene, Volume 2, Part 1 (Oslo: University of Oslo)

References

2005 deaths
1917 births
Academic staff of the University of Oslo
Archaeologists from Oslo
Norwegian curators
Norwegian archaeologists
Norwegian women archaeologists
20th-century archaeologists
Recipients of the King's Medal of Merit
20th-century Norwegian women writers
20th-century Norwegian writers
Norwegian women curators